Kluczewnica  is a village in the administrative district of Gmina Słupca, within Słupca County, Greater Poland Voivodeship, in west-central Poland.

The village has a population of 13.

References

Kluczewnica